Poshtkuh-e Chakuy (also Romanized as Poshtkūh-e Chakūy) is a village in Rudkhaneh Rural District, Rudkhaneh District, Rudan County, Hormozgan Province, Iran. At the 2006 census, its population was 37, in 8 families.

References 

Populated places in Rudan County